Oscar Russell White (August 27, 1908 – April 7, 1983) was an American Thoroughbred horse racing trainer who twice won the third leg of the United States Triple Crown of Thoroughbred Racing. In 1941, he took over training duties for the prominent racing stable of Walter and Sarah Jeffords when Buddy Hirsch left to serve in World War II with the United States Army.

Oscar White's best horses were:
 Pavot – undefeated 1944 American Champion Two-Year-Old Male Horse and winner of the 1945 Belmont Stakes
 Kiss Me Kate – voted 1951 American Champion Three-Year-Old Filly
 One Count – won 1952 Belmont Stakes, voted 1952 American Horse of the Year

In 2011, Oscar White was elected to Delaware Park Racetrack's Wall of Fame.

References

1908 births
1983 deaths
American horse trainers
People from Wicomico County, Maryland